The men's super heavyweight (+91 kilograms) event at the 2010 Asian Games took place from 16 to 25 November 2010 at Lingnan Mingzhu Gymnasium, Foshan, China.

Like all Asian Games boxing events, the competition was a straight single-elimination tournament. All bouts consisted of three three-minute rounds. The boxers receive points for every successful punch they land on their opponent's head or upper body. The boxer with the most points at the end of the bouts wins. 

A total of 9 men from 9 countries competed in this event, limited to fighters whose body weight was over 91 kilograms. Zhang Zhilei of China won the gold medal. He beat Ivan Dychko of Kazakhstan 7–5 in the final bout in Foshan Gymnasium. Rouhollah Hosseini and Paramjeet Samota shared the bronze medal.

Schedule
All times are China Standard Time (UTC+08:00)

Results 
Legend
RSC — Won by referee stop contest

References

External links
Official website

Men's 100